Mariners RFC is a Bermudian rugby club in Hamilton.

Mariners RFC was formed out of the BAA Rugby Club in the late 1950s as expats and locals alike were unhappy with the format of rugby in Bermuda. Renegades had previously pulled out of the BAA.
Mariners based at the Mariners Club close to the Robin Hood, Bermuda have oft been Bermuda's premier club in term of social rugby for expats and locals alike.

Internationally Capped Players
Daniel McGavern
Josh McGavern
Paul Reed
David Conway
Rob Morgan
Gavin Corcoran
Stewart Thompson
Richard (Billy) Tempest-Mitchell
Dustin Archibald

References

External links
Mariners RFC

Bermudian rugby union teams